Celestino Migliore (born 1 July 1952) is an Italian Archbishop of the Catholic Church who serves as the Apostolic Nuncio to France. He previously served as Permanent Observer of the Holy See to the United Nations. He has spent most of his career in the diplomatic service of the Holy See.

Early years
Celestino Migliore was born on 1 July 1952 in Cuneo, Italy. He was ordained a priest on 25 June 1977.

He has a master's degree in theology from the Center of Theological Studies in Fossano, Italy, and a Licentiate and Doctorate in Canon Law from the Pontifical Lateran University in Rome. To prepare for a diplomatic career he entered the Pontifical Ecclesiastical Academy in 1977.

Joining the Holy See's diplomatic service, Migliore served as attaché and second secretary to the Apostolic Delegation in Angola from 1980 to 1984. In 1984, he was assigned to the Apostolic Nunciature in the United States, then in 1988, he was assigned to the Apostolic Nunciature in Egypt, and in 1989 he was then assigned at the Apostolic Nunciature in Warsaw, Poland. In 1992, he was appointed as Special Envoy to the Council of Europe in Strasbourg, France, until 1995, when he became the Under-Secretary of the Section for Relations with States of the Vatican's Secretariat of State. During his term as Under-Secretary he was also in charge of fostering relations with countries that did not yet have formal relations with the Holy See, and in that capacity he led delegations to China, Vietnam, North Korea, and numerous United Nations conferences. He also taught ecclesiastical diplomacy at the Pontifical Lateran University, as a visiting professor.

Permanent Observer to the United Nations
On 30 October 2002, Pope John Paul II nominated him to the position of Permanent Observer to the United Nations. He was the fourth person to serve in the role. At the same time, he was also appointed Titular Archbishop of Canosa. He received his episcopal consecration on 6 January 2003.

In 2007, he noted that all "Member States affirmed the collective international responsibility to protect populations from genocide, war crimes, ethnic cleansing and crimes against humanity, and their willingness to take timely and decisive collective action for this purpose, through the Security Council, when peaceful means prove inadequate and national authorities are manifestly failing to do it. My delegation believes there is need to pursue the debate and juridical codification along this very line, wherein sovereignty is not understood as an absolute right and used as a shield against outside involvement, but as a responsibility not merely to protect citizens, but also to promote their welfare. Through the creation of legal norms, arbitration of legal disputes and the establishment of safeguards, especially when States fail in their responsibility to protect, the United Nations is called to be the propulsive forum for the rule of law in all corners of the globe".

During Migliore's tenure, on 18 April 2008, Pope Benedict XVI made a pastoral visit to the United Nations Headquarters and met with Secretary-General Ban Ki-moon and addressed the General Assembly and staff.

In September 2008, he said:

In November 2008, Migliore led the delegation of the Holy See to the Follow-up International Conference on Financing for Development to Review the Implementation of the Monterrey Consensus in Doha, Qatar, during which he stressed the importance of right action and the human person, stating that "Global development is, at its heart, a question not only of technical logistics but more fundamentally of morality" and that "Social and economic development must be measured and implemented with the human person at the center of all decisions."

In response to a proposed nonbinding UN declaration on LGBT rights introduced at the United Nations by member States of the European Union, Migliore said that unjust forms of discrimination against homosexuals must be avoided, but he also said that adding such "new categories [that would be] protected from discrimination" would create in turn "new and implacable discriminations". He continued by saying that "Countries that don't recognize the union between people of the same sex as marriage will be punished and pressured." The proposed declaration does not in fact mention same-sex marriage, but most of the nations that support the document do recognize same-sex unions.

Speaking on the 2008–2009 Israel–Gaza conflict, Migliore said that the Holy See "would like to express its solidarity with the civilians in those regions who bear the brunt of a cruel conflict"; "that Security Council resolution 1860, of January 8, which calls for an immediate and enduring ceasefire as well as for an unimpeded humanitarian assistance, be implemented fully"; and "that so many failed efforts are due to insufficiently courageous and coherent political will for establishing peace, from every side, and ultimately an unwillingness to come together and forge a just and lasting peace."

On 6 May 2009, Migliore called for "concrete, transparent and convincing steps" towards nuclear disarmament and non-proliferation. Speaking to the third session of the Preparatory Committee for the 2010 U.N. Conference on the Non-Proliferation of Nuclear Weapons, he said the Treaty on the Non-Proliferation of Weapons (NPT) remains a "cornerstone" of nuclear disarmament, after four decades. "The Holy See reaffirms its strong and continuing support for the NPT and calls for universal and full adherence to and compliance with the Treaty", he said. The first measure he suggested was starting negotiations for a Fissile Material Cut-Off Treaty, which he said are "overdue". Migliore also advocated that the peaceful use of nuclear energy should be under "strict control" of the International Atomic Energy Agency.

Apostolic Nuncio
Pope Benedict XVI appointed him Apostolic Nuncio to Poland on 30 June 2010.

On 28 May 2016, Pope Francis named him nuncio to Russia, and on 21 January 2017 named him nuncio to Uzbekistan as well.

On 11 January 2020, Pope Francis named him nuncio to France.

See also
 List of heads of the diplomatic missions of the Holy See

References

External links

 His Excellency Archbishop Celestino Migliore
 

 

 

 

1952 births
Living people
People from Cuneo
21st-century Italian Roman Catholic titular archbishops
Apostolic Nuncios to Poland
Apostolic Nuncios to Russia
Apostolic Nuncios to Uzbekistan
Apostolic Nuncios to France
Permanent Observers of the Holy See to the Council of Europe
Permanent Observers of the Holy See to the United Nations
Pontifical Ecclesiastical Academy alumni
Pontifical Lateran University alumni
Grand Officers of the Order of Merit of the Italian Republic